Botolphs Bridge Halt railway station was a little-used station on the Romney, Hythe and Dymchurch Railway in Kent, England.

Botolphs Bridge or Botolph's Bridge is a hamlet on the Romney Marsh, consisting of a small group of family homes and a public house. Although the railway passes some distance from the settlement, the long road from the hamlet to the coast is called "Botolphs Bridge Road", and intersects the railway at a level crossing. Here a small halt was provided when the line opened in 1927, with a single wooden waiting shelter for the convenience of passengers.

The halt was closed in 1939 due to very low traffic figures. The manner of its closure was somewhat spectacular, and well reported locally at the time. Captain Howey, the railway's founder and principal shareholder, declared the station closed, instructed train drivers not to stop there, and then set fire to the wooden shelter. With no public warning of the impending closure, the flames and smoke prompted an emergency call to the Fire Brigade, who turned out an appliance and crew. The firemen were very surprised to arrive on scene and discover the burning building's owner with a box of matches.

Gallery

References 

Disused railway stations in Kent
Heritage railway stations in Kent
Transport in Folkestone and Hythe
Railway stations in Great Britain opened in 1927
Railway stations in Great Britain closed in 1939
1927 establishments in England
1939 disestablishments in England